The Homestead Seaboard Air Line Railway Station is a historic Seaboard Air Line Railroad depot in Homestead, Florida. The station is located at 214 Northwest 9th Terrace, approximately three-quarters of a mile west of downtown Homestead.

Constructed in 1927, it is identical to the original construction of the Delray Beach Seaboard station farther north in Palm Beach County, with the sole exception of its use of the same corinthian arches used in the Naples Seaboard station and Hialeah Seaboard station, as opposed to the plain stucco arches of the Delray Beach station. It has the distinction of being both the southernmost Seaboard station and the southernmost railroad station in the United States still standing.

Like many Seaboard stations in South Florida, the structure combined both a passenger station and a freight depot. However, the station at most only briefly saw passenger service in the late 1920s before the Seaboard extension between Hialeah Junction and Homestead became dedicated to freight traffic only. The structure has long since been abandoned for freight handling, and is now privately owned by an auction house, which is attempting to restore the station.  The adjacent tracks now only see sporadic freight service by CSX Transportation, the successor to Seaboard.

References

External links
Photos of the station from the 1920s, 1930s, and 1950s

Homestead, Florida
Railway stations in the United States opened in 1927
Seaboard Air Line Railroad stations
1927 establishments in Florida
Former railway stations in Florida